Copland is a surname. It is sometimes the anglicized form of the Yiddish surname Kaplan. Notable people with the surname include:

Aaron Copland (1900-1990), American composer
Calaigh Copland (born 1987), Canadian-born Ghanaian footballer
David Copland (1842 – 1920) Scottish-born Australian politician
Denise Copland (born 1952), New Zealand artist
Douglas Copland (1894 – 1971), Australian academic & economist
Ernie Copland (1924-1971), Scottish footballer
Geoffrey Malcolm Copland (active 1992-2007), British physicist & vice-chancellor
Henry Copland (c. 1710–1754), British furniture designer and ornamentalist
Jackie Copland (born 1947), Scottish footballer
James Copland (1834-1902), New Zealand Presbyterian minister
John de Coupland, also John Copland (died 1363), a knight
Kay Copland (active 2010), Scottish sport shooter
Marc Copland (born 1948), American jazz pianist and saxophonist
Patrick Copland (1749-1822) joint founder of the Royal Society of Edinburgh
Robert Copland (15th century–16th century), English printer and author
Robert Copland-Crawford (1852-1894), soldier and amateur sportsperson
William Robertson Copland (1838-1907) Scottish civil engineer

Also
Lawson Lysnar Copland Field (1896-1981), New Zealand farmer
Mab Copland Lineman, (1892-1957), Scottish-born US lawyer
Clifford Copland Paterson (1879-1948), English scientist & electrical engineer
Walter Copland Perry (1814-1911), British author & lawyer